St. Joseph is an unincorporated community and census-designated place (CDP) in Riverdale Township, Kossuth County, Iowa, United States. As of the 2010 census the population was 61.

Geography
Iowa Highway 408 leads east from St. Joseph  to Lu Verne.

It is bordered to the east by the East Fork of the Des Moines River.

History
One of the earliest histories states "the town was never laid out, as far as the records show, but grew by evolution." The settlement of St. Joseph was formerly known as "Hale". St. Joe began its official existence in 1865 when Oscar Hale, the first landowner of the area, started a post office and hotel. The new community then became known as Hale's post office or Hale.

In 1870, George Hollenbeck came from Wisconsin and started a general store. Casper Waldbillig moved from Dubuque in 1878 and opened a saloon. One of the early settlers was John Devine, who owned a large herd of cattle and was nicknamed the "cattle baron". Many of the early family names are still found in the vicinity today.

In 1871, Gregory Hollenbeck and Margaret Schreiber Hollenbeck donated land on which to build a church in Hale. Father Lenihan was the circuit pastor at that time, and the first church was built in 1872 at a cost of about $1,800.

St. Joseph's population was 72 in 1902, and 100 in 1925.

Since the town of St. Joe is small and unincorporated, the community's life and activities revolve almost entirely around their church and school. In 1996, the parish numbered 141 families. The parish school had 87 students attending grades K through 12.

Demographics

References

Census-designated places in Kossuth County, Iowa
1865 establishments in Iowa
Populated places established in 1865